David Roderick (born 1970) is an American poet from Plymouth, Massachusetts, who taught for nine years at the University of North Carolina at Greensboro. Previously, he had lectured at the University of North Carolina, Chapel Hill, as the Kenan Visiting Writer at the University of San Francisco, and at Stanford University, where he also conducted classes for its Education Program for Gifted Youth summer program.

In 2016, with Rachel Richardson, he founded Left Margin LIT, a creative writing center in Berkeley, California, that offers readings by and classes for poets and writers of creative prose, both fiction and nonfiction.

His work has appeared in 32 Poems, Boulevard, Gulf Coast, Triquarterly, Ontario Review, Poetry Northwest, River Styx, Verse, The Antioch Review, The Hudson Review, The Missouri Review, The Massachusetts Review, and The Virginia Quarterly Review.

Education
 B.A. – Colby College
 MFA, MFA Program for Poets & Writers – The University of Massachusetts Amherst.
 Wallace Stegner Fellow in Poetry, Stanford University.

Awards
2021-2022 NEA Creative Writing Fellowship
2007-2008 Amy Lowell Poetry Travelling Scholarship
2006 American Poetry Review/Honickman First Book Prize
2003 Robert and Charlotte Baron Fellowship of the American Antiquarian Society
 Scholarship – Bread Loaf Writers' Conference

Personal life
Roderick lives in Berkeley, California, with the poet Rachel Richardson and their two children.

Books
 Blue Colonial (Copper Canyon Press, 2006)
 The Americans (The University of Pittsburgh Press [2014])

References

External links
 David Roderick in AGNI

1970 births
Living people
American male poets
Colby College alumni
University of Massachusetts Amherst MFA Program for Poets & Writers alumni
University of North Carolina at Chapel Hill faculty
University of San Francisco faculty
University of North Carolina at Greensboro faculty
Stegner Fellows
21st-century American poets
21st-century American male writers